Rainieria calceata is a species of stilt-legged flies belonging to the family  Micropezidae.

Distribution and habitat
This species is present in Central and Western Europe (Albania, Austria, Belgium, Czech Republic, Denmark, Germany, Hungary, Italy, Romania, Slovakia, Sweden, Switzerland) and in the Near East. These stilt-legged flies are usually found in old forests. They are mainly associated with  beech deciduous forests.

Description
These stilt-legged flies have a very elongate, parallel-sided, slender black bodies. The head is small and  rounded, with short antennae. The abdomen is black, long and narrow. They show characteristic long thin legs. The fore legs are markedly smaller than the other pairs. Femora are black at base. The tarsal segments of the first and third legs are white. The narrow wings are infuscated, with a dark tip and some darker markings.

Biology
This species breeds and develops in moist organic debris and rotting wood in hollow tree-trunks.

References

External links
 
 
 Diptera.info

Micropezidae
Insects described in 1820